Baptist International Missions, Incorporated (BIMI) is a missions organization that provides aid to Independent Baptist missionaries.

External links
 Baptist International Missions Inc. Website

Independent Baptist missionary societies